Fadi al-Hadami (born; 4 November 1977 ) is a Palestinian politician who is currently serving as Minister of Jerusalem Affairs in the Palestinian Authority since April 2019. He has also served as Director-general of the Jerusalem Chamber of Commerce and Investment.

Fadi al-Hadami was arrested in 2020 by Israeli authorities. Earlier, Fadi was arrested in late July 2019 in the eastern part of Jerusalem and held for several hours.

References

Living people
Palestinian politicians
1977 births
People from Jerusalem
Palestinian economists
The American University in Cairo alumni
Alumni of the University of Manchester Institute of Science and Technology